Sarjana Muda was Iwan Fals solo debut album, following two albums as part of the group Amburadul, and some comedy songs released on various compilations. It was released in 1981 on the Musica label.

It was named as number 27 of 'The 150 Greatest Indonesian Albums of All Time' by Indonesian Rolling Stone magazine. It featured high production standards, as Musica had identified Iwan Fals' talents from his existing recordings, and were willing to invest in the album. Guest stars on the album include Idris Sardi, wh played violin on Guru Oemar Bakrie, while Jazz violinist Luluk Purwanto plays throughout the album, a role that she reprised on the album's follow-up, 'Opini'.

The album contains many of Iwan Fals most popular songs, and contains mostly wistful ballads, but also the lively country and western-style Guru Oemar Bakri and blackly comic 'Ambulance Zig Zag'.

Iwan Fals' early influence from Bob Dylan is evident in the richly descriptive documentary lyrics, and also in the heavy use of harmonica. The album also features country-style banjo and violin.

Track listing
 Sarjana Muda - ('Graduate'): The story of an unemployed university graduate
 Guru Oemar Bakri - About Oemar Bakri, a (presumably fictional) old-fashioned teacher, who has spent forty years devoted to teaching:
 Hatta - A memorial for the recently deceased Indonesian revolutionary hero and politician Mohammad Hatta
 Doa Pengobral Dosa
 Si Tua Sais Pedati (The Old Ox Cart) - A narrative about an old ox-drawn cart, that requires no fuel and creates no pollution.
 Ambulance Zig Zag - A black comedy, previously released on the comic album Canda Dalam Nada. It tells the tale of a rich woman, brought into hospital by ambulance, and sped into the treatment room. It then contrasts this with the treatment of a poor patient
 22 Januari
 Puing (Debris) - A song about the horrors of war.
 Yang Terlupakan (aka "Denting Piano") - (The Forgotten)
 Bangunlah Putra Putri Pertiwi (Awaken Sons & Daughters of the (mother)land)  - A nationalistic song referencing three aspects of Indonesian national identity, Garuda, the winged bird, Pancasila, the national philosophy, and the Indonesian flag

Notes

1981 debut albums
Indonesian-language albums
Iwan Fals albums